Derek Oldbury (1924 - July, 1994) (often known as DEO) was a British draughts champion from Devon.  He was a rival of Marion Tinsley and, after Tinsley, "probably the second best player of all time."  Oldbury was interested in Go As You Please (GAYP) draughts, in which players are free to choose their own opening moves.

He competed in 7 world championship matches, winning in 1976, 1976 (GAYP) and 1991 (3-move).

Oldbury was born paraplegic.  He wrote the 6-volume The Complete Encyclopaedia of Draughts.

References

External links
Move Over - online book by Derek Oldbury, an excellent introduction to draughts
The Unknown DEO - 62 draughts columns by Oldbury for the Rotherham Advertiser

British draughts players
Players of English draughts
Sportspeople from Devon
English people with disabilities
1924 births
1994 deaths